The Unwinding a live album by Thessalonians, released in 1986 by Silent.

Track listing

Personnel
Adapted from the liner notes of The Unwinding.

Thessalonians
 Kim Cascone – instruments
 David Gardner – instruments
 David James – instruments
 Kurt Robinson – instruments
 Larry Thrasher – instruments

Release history

References

External links 
 

1986 live albums
Thessalonians (band) albums